A3, A03 or A.III may refer to:

 A3 paper, a paper size defined by ISO 216

Biology 
 A3 regulatory sequence, a sequence for the insulin gene
 Adenosine A3 receptor, a human gene
 Annexin A3, a human gene
 ATC code A03 Drugs for functional gastrointestinal disorders, a subgroup of the Anatomical Therapeutic Chemical Classification System
 Brachydactyly type A3, a disease
 British NVC community A3 (Spirodela polyrhiza - Hydrocharis morsus-ranae community), a British Isles plants community
 Gibberellin A3, a plant hormone
 HLA-A3, a Human MHC Serotype HLA-A
 Subfamily A3, a rhodopsin-like receptors subfamily
 Urea transporter A3, a trans-membrane protein

Games
 A3!, a Japanese video game and multimedia franchise
 A3 - Assault on the Aerie of the Slave Lords, a 1981 module for the Dungeons & Dragons fantasy role-playing game
 Alpha Trion, as the former name of this character from the Transformers Series
 Bird's Opening (A03), in chess, by the Encyclopaedia of Chess Openings code

Music
 A3, a musical note, the A below Middle C
 Alabama 3, a band known as A3 in the U.S. to avoid confusion with the country group Alabama
 A-3, a Yamaha musical instrument product

Sports
 A3 (classification), an amputee sport classification
 A3 Champions Cup, a club football tournament also known as the East Asian Champions Cup
 Arrows A3, a 1980 racing car
 A3, a climbing grade

Vehicles
 A-3 lifeboat, a 1947 lifeboat for carrying by the SB-29 Superfortress
 Abrial A-3 Oricou, a French touring aircraft designed in 1927
 Audi A3, a model of automobile
 Aussat (Optus) A3, a 1987 Australian telecommunication satellite
 Bavarian A III, an 1851 German steam locomotive model
 Chery A3, a compact car
 LNER Gresley Classes A1 and A3, a Pacific locomotive class designed by Sir Nigel Gresley
 Prussian A 3, a 1910 Prussian railbus
 SP&S Class A3, a 1914 steam locomotives class

Weapons and military
 A-3 Falcon, a variant of the Curtiss Falcon, an attack aircraft manufactured by the Curtiss Aircraft Company
 A-3 Skywarrior, a strategic bomber manufactured by Douglas Aircraft Company
 AUG A3, a variant of the Austrian Steyr AUG rifle
 Fokker A.III, a 1915 armed version of the Fokker M.5 aircraft
 HMS A3, a British A-class submarine of the Royal Navy
 Kampfgeschwader 200, from its historic Geschwaderkennung code with the Luftwaffe in World War II
 Polaris A-3 missile, an American submarine-launched missile
 Wendes Artillery Regiment, a former Swedish Army artillery regiment, by designation
 A3, the staff designation for air force headquarters staff concerned with operations
 A3 Air Operations Branch, of the Joint Force Air Component Headquarters UK
 USS Grampus (SS-4), a Plunger-class submarine of the United States Navy
 Aggregate 3, the 3rd design in the Aggregate family of rockets, precursor to the V-2 rocket, developed by the Germans during World War II

Other uses
 A3, an example of a root system with numerous physical and geometrical applications
 A-3 visa, a document given to employees of A-1 and A-2 Visa Holders who are representing a foreign government inside the U.S.
 A3, the code for permission to use specific land or premises for restaurants and cafés in town and country planning in the United Kingdom
 A3 roads, in several countries
 A-003, the fourth abort test of the Apollo spacecraft
 Biu-Mandara A.3 languages, an Afro-Asiatic family of languages spoken in Cameroon and Nigeria
 Cowon A3, an audio media player
 Aegean Airlines, by IATA code 
 Tonga, by aircraft registration code
 ARITH-MATIC, as the former name for this programming language
 "Agora! Anarchy! Action!", a slogan for Agorism taken from the New Libertarian Manifesto by Samuel Edward Konkin III
 A3 problem solving, a structured problem solving and continuous improvement approach, first employed at Toyota
 Samsung Galaxy A3, a smartphone manufactured by Samsung Electronics
 Samsung Galaxy A03, a smartphone manufactured by Samsung Electronics
 A³ (A-cubed), an Airbus start-up in the Silicon Valley
 A3 (TV channel), an Algerian public national television channel also known as Thalitha TV
 RED A03, an aircraft diesel engine by German company Red Aviation GmbH

See also
 A-Train III, a 1992 computer game
 M16A3, a variant of the American M16 rifle
 M60A3, a variant of the American M60 Patton tank
 A3J, the original designation of the US Navy's A-5 Vigilante bomber